The ACT Greens is a green political party located in the Australian Capital Territory (ACT), and a member of the federation of the Australian Greens. Both parties were formed in 1992, three years after the ACT achieved self-government in 1989.

Since its formation the ACT Greens has had a significant presence in the ACT Legislative Assembly, having formed minority or coalition governments with the ACT Labor Party since 2008.

History
1995–1998 Assembly

Two Greens candidates, Lucy Horodny and Kerrie Tucker,  were successful at the 1995 election, the first to be run under the Hare-Clark system. The election resulted in a hung parliament, but the Liberal Party was able to form government with two independents.

1998–2001 Assembly

Kerrie Tucker was left as the only Greens member during this assembly, in which the Liberal Party again formed government with the help of independents.

2001–2004 Assembly

Kerrie Tucker was once again the only Greens member during this assembly, in which the Labor Party formed a minority government with her support and that of Australian Democrat Roslyn Dundas. There was no formal parliamentary agreement between the three governing parties for this assembly.

2004–2008 Assembly

This was the first ACT election since the enactment of a fixed four-year term. Deb Foskey was the sole Greens member of the assembly, in which the Labor Party held the majority.

2008–2012 Assembly

Following the 2008 election, the ACT Greens held the balance of power in the 17-member Legislative Assembly, with four members (Amanda Bresnan, Meredith Hunter, Shane Rattenbury and Caroline Le Couteur), to Labor's seven and the Liberals with six. After deliberations with both the Labor and Liberal parties, the Greens chose to support a Labor minority government.

2012 - 2016 Assembly

Following the 2012 ACT election, Shane Rattenbury was the only ACT Greens MLA to retain his seat in the Legislative Assembly., and entered into a power sharing arrangement to allow the Labor Party to once again form minority government.

The agreement gave Shane Rattenbury the ministerial portfolios of Ageing; Housing; Corrections; and Aboriginal and Torres Strait Islander Affairs, as well as Territory and Municipal Services in the Second Gallagher Ministry and the First Barr Ministry.

2016–2020 Assembly

Shane Rattenbury retained a seat in the expanded Legislative Assembly at the 2016 ACT election, and held the ministerial portfolios of Climate Change and Sustainability; Corrections and Justice Health; Justice, Consumer Affairs and Road Safety; and Mental Health.  Caroline Le Couteur was also reelected, after losing her seat in 2012. The Greens maintained their position in the balance of power for a third consecutive term, and the ACT Greens and ACT Labor parties signed another parliamentary agreement setting out the terms of their power-sharing arrangement in government.

2020–2024 Assembly

Leader

Party leaders

Electoral results

State

Federal

Members of Parliament

Current Legislative Assembly members 

 Shane Rattenbury (2008–current)
 Rebecca Vassarotti (2020–current)
 Emma Davidson (2020–current)
 Andrew Braddock (2020–current)
 Jo Clay (2020–current)
 Johnathan Davis (2020–current)

Previous Legislative Assembly members 
 Lucy Horodny (1995–1998)
 Kerrie Tucker (1995–2004)
 Deb Foskey (2004–2008)
 Amanda Bresnan (2008–2012)
 Meredith Hunter (2008–2012)
 Caroline Le Couteur (2008–2012, 2016–2020)

References

Australian Greens by state
Greens